Jemima Moore (born 18 March 1992)  is a Paralympian athlete from Australia competing mainly in category T53-54 4 x 100 metres relay events. She represented Australia at the 2008 Beijing and 2016 Rio Paralympics.

Personal
She was born in Geelong, Victoria. At the age of six,  she collapsed due to a rare spinal virus and this affected her lower back and caused her long term incomplete paraplegia.

Athletics
She competed in the 2008 Summer Paralympics in Beijing, China. There she won a silver medal in the women's T53-54 4 x 100 metres relay event. She also competed in the individual 100m for T54 athletes but finished third in her heat and failed to progress to the final.

Moore also competed in the 2016 Rio Paralympics where she won a silver medal in the Women's 4 × 400 m T53-54 relay. She finished 11th in the Women's T54 100 m and 400 m and 10th in the Women's 800 m.

At the 2017 World Para Athletics Championships in London, England, she finished 10th in the Women's 400m T54, 800m T53 and 1500m T54 events. Moore was one of  three Geelong Para Athletes, as well as Martin Jackson and Sam McIntosh, to be selected for the Championships.

Notes

External links
 
 
 Jemima Moore at Australian Athletics Historical Results

1992 births
Paralympic athletes of Australia
Athletes (track and field) at the 2008 Summer Paralympics
Athletes (track and field) at the 2016 Summer Paralympics
Paralympic silver medalists for Australia
Medalists at the 2008 Summer Paralympics
Medalists at the 2016 Summer Paralympics
Sportspeople from Geelong
People with paraplegia
Living people
Paralympic medalists in athletics (track and field)